The National Provincial Championship, also known in short as the NPC or commercially known as the 'Radio New Zealand National Championship', was the predecessor to the current ITM Cup and Heartland Championship in New Zealand rugby. 1976 was the first year of the National Provincial Championship, Bay of Plenty were the winners of Division 1, while  Taranaki and South Canterbury were the winners of Division 2 North Island and Division 2 South Island respectively.

Division 1

Standings

These were the NPC Division 1 standings for the 1976 season.

Games

May 1976

June 1976

July 1976

August 1976

September 1976

Division 2 (North Island)

Standings

These were the NPC Division 2 standings (North Island) for the 1976 season.

Games

May 1976

June 1976

July 1976

August 1976

September 1976

Division 2 (South Island)

Standings

These were the NPC Division 2 standings (South Island) for the 1976 season.

Games

June 1976

July 1976

August 1976

September 1976

Promotion/relegation games

As North Auckland came last in Division 1, the unbeaten winners of Division 2 (North Island) who were Taranaki got promoted to Division 1 to replace North Auckland.

South Canterbury who won Division 2 (South Island) had a chance to be promoted up to Division 1 where they faced Southland but lost the game 24 to 11 and so did not get promoted.

References
 thesilverfern.co.nz

National Provincial Championship
1